General Sir Martin Andrew Dillon  (19 June 1826 – 1913) was an Irish senior officer in the British Army.

Biography
Dillon was the son of Major Andrew Dillon and entered the British Army in 1843.

He was present as a captain at the Siege of Lucknow during the Indian Mutiny of 1857 and as a major in the subsequent Oudh campaign of 1858. In the China Campaign of 1860 he served as an assistant adjutant-general on the staff of Major-General Sir Robert Napier and as the latter's military secretary in India and Abbysinia. He was Aide-de-Camp to Queen Victoria from 1868 to 1878   when, now promoted Major-general, he was appointed assistant military secretary to Prince George, Duke of Cambridge.

He was knighted as a Knight Commander of the Order of the Bath (KCB) in 1887. Promoted lieutenant-general in 1887 and full general on 16 July 1892, he was given the colonelcy of The Prince of Wales's Own (West Yorkshire Regiment) in 1897, transferring in 1913 to be briefly colonel-commandant of the 1st Battalion of the Rifle Brigade.

Dillon was appointed a Knight Grand Cross of the Order of the Bath (GCB) in the 1902 Coronation Honours list published on 26 June 1902, and was invested by King Edward VII at Buckingham Palace on 8 August 1902.

References

 

1826 births
1913 deaths
British Army generals
Knights Grand Cross of the Order of the Bath
Companions of the Order of the Star of India
British military personnel of the Indian Rebellion of 1857
British military personnel of the Second Opium War
Rifle Brigade officers
West Yorkshire Regiment officers